Ariane Brodier (born 26 April 1979) is a French television personality, actress, TV host and humorist.

Life and career 
After being an animator on the series "Opération séduction aux Caraïbes" (an adaptation of the Harem TV show), Ariane was a columnist on a talk show hosted by Elsa Fayer on Fun TV. She then began co-presenting a new edition of "Morning Live" on Fun TV with Cyril Hanouna.

After a meteorology course, she became a weather girl on M6. During this time, Ariane also hosted these programs:
 M6 Music Black (hip-hop, R&B, + interviews)
 LGK (teens program) on NT1
 Nature documentary on NT1

For 2 years, Ariane had been hosting two music programs on M6:
 The Alternative (pop, rock, trip-ho, électro, rap)
 CLUB (best of club music videos)

Ariane also presented a program "One Day With", where in each episode she spent a day in the life of a singer.

On 2 August 2008, Ariane left M6 Channel. In September, she joined France 2 where she works as a columnist in Julien Courbet's program "Service Maximum". On August 30, 2014, Ariane competed on the television show Fort Boyard.

Filmography

References

External links
 
 http://www.myspace.com/arianebrodier
 https://www.facebook.com/pages/Ariane-Brodier/10619659084

1979 births
Living people
French television presenters
French women television presenters
French journalists
French women journalists